Adam Matoš (born 17 February 2002) is a Slovak footballer who plays as a forward.

Club career

MFK Tatran Liptovský Mikuláš
Matoš made his professional debut for MFK Tatran Liptovský Mikuláš against AS Trenčín on 2 April 2022.

References

External links
 MFK Tatran Liptovský Mikuláš official club profile 
 
 
 Futbalnet profile 

2002 births
Living people
Slovak footballers
Association football forwards
MFK Tatran Liptovský Mikuláš players
2. Liga (Slovakia) players
Slovak Super Liga players